Murari is an epithet of the Hindu deity Krishna, referring to his act of slaying the asura, Mura.

Murari may also refer to:

People
 Murari (author) (approx. 9th century AD), Sanskrit dramatic poet and author of Anargharāghava
 Sarvesh Murari, Indian cinematographer
 Krishna Murari Moghe (born 1947), Indian politician
 Murari Lal Sharma Neeras (born 1936), Indian author
 Murari Raj Sharma (1951–2020), Nepalese ambassador to the United Nations

Other
 Murari (2001 film), a Telugu film directed by Krishna Vamshi
 Murari (2015 film), an Indian Kannada-language action drama film
 Murari Chand College, a division of Bangladesh National University in Sylhet
 Nari Nari Naduma Murari, 1990 Telugu film directed by Kodi Ramakrishna

See also
 Murarai, a town in West Bengal, India